Cutler Reservoir is a reservoir located in Cache Valley in the U.S. state of Utah. It is an impoundment on the Bear River built for irrigation, flood control, and water supply.

The concrete gravity-arch Cutler Dam, built in 1927, is located in easternmost Box Elder County, although the reservoir is almost entirely in Cache County, to its east.  Cutler contains several fish species, including catfish, walleye, and bass. The reservoir and adjacent swamps are listed as an important bird area by the National Audubon Society; species include hawks, falcons, eagles and osprey; pelicans, great blue heron and ibis; multiple species of owl; ducks, geese and swans; and others.

The Island is in Cutler Reservoir.

References

External links

Cutler Reservoir, Utah (UT), United States
Bear River Watershed

Bear River (Great Salt Lake)
Reservoirs in Utah
Dams in Utah
PacifiCorp dams
Lakes of Box Elder County, Utah
Lakes of Cache County, Utah
Buildings and structures in Box Elder County, Utah
Buildings and structures in Cache County, Utah
Dams completed in 1927